Francisco David Fydriszewski (born 13 April 1993) is an Argentine footballer who plays for S.D. Aucas on loan from Newell's Old Boys as a forward.

He is often nicknamed Polaco due to his Polish heritage.

References

External links

1993 births
Living people
Footballers from Rosario, Santa Fe
Argentine people of Polish descent
Argentine footballers
Argentine expatriate footballers
Association football forwards
Argentine Primera División players
Primera Nacional players
Chilean Primera División players
Segunda División players
Ecuadorian Serie A players
Newell's Old Boys footballers
Villa Dálmine footballers
Argentinos Juniors footballers
CD Lugo players
C.D. Antofagasta footballers
L.D.U. Portoviejo footballers
Argentine expatriate sportspeople in Spain
Argentine expatriate sportspeople in Chile
Argentine expatriate sportspeople in Ecuador
Expatriate footballers in Chile
Expatriate footballers in Spain
Expatriate footballers in Ecuador